József Hampel (10 November 1849 – 25 March 1913) was a Hungarian archaeologist and member of the Hungarian Academy of Sciences. He also worked as an editor-publisher of the professional journal Archaeologiai Értesítő.

References

Archaeologists from Budapest
1849 births
1913 deaths